Costa Oriental (Eastern Coast) may refer to:
 Comarca de la Costa Oriental, Spain
 Costa Oriental del Lago de Maracaibo, Zulia State, Venezuela
 Costa Oriental de Asturias, Spain